Elizabeth Stark may refer to:

Elizabeth Stark, character in 007: From Russia with Love
Lizzie Stark, character in Peaky Blinders
Elizabeth Stark (writer), see 12th Lambda Literary Awards
Elizabeth Stark (explorer), Scottish born mountaineer and Professor of speech science

See also
Betsy Stark, media executive